Bayangol (Mongolian: rich river) is a sum (district) of Övörkhangai Province in southern Mongolia.  In 2008, its population was 4,572.

References 

Districts of Övörkhangai Province